A Court of Audit or Court of Accounts is a Supreme audit institution, i.e. a government institution performing financial and/or legal audit (i.e. Statutory audit or External audit) on the executive branch of power.

See also 
Most of those institutions are INTOSAI members, International Organization of Supreme Audit Institutions.
Government audit, Government performance auditing, Performance audit

References

Government audit
Auditing organizations